Byun Sung-hwan (Hangul: 변성환; ; born 22 December 1979) is a South Korean retired footballer.

Club career

Ulsan Hyundai
During 2002 to 2006 Byun made 56 appearances for Ulsan Hyundai.

Busan I'Park
Byun made 16 appearances for Busan I'Park during 2007.

Jeju United
During 2008 Byun made 16 appearances for Jeju United.

Sydney FC
After impressing in pre-season trials with Sydney FC, including a goal against Manly United, he was announced as a new signing on 25 June 2009 for the upcoming 2009–10 season, on a two-year contract. His good form made him a crowd favourite amongst the Sydney fans. He is a quality left back who likes to get forward in attack. His two-footed crossing ability is a key to his game. It is noted that he is a fast player – prior to 2005, he could run the 100m in 12.2 seconds. He is known for his attacking abilities and speed.

Byun scored the winning goal and his first professional goal, for Sydney FC in the penalty shoot out of the 2009/10 Grand final against Melbourne Victory. Sydney FC released Byun at the end of the 2010–11 A-League season, deciding not to extend his contract for the Asian Champions League.

Newcastle Jets
After being released by Sydney, Byun entered into negotiations with fellow A-League club Newcastle Jets. And on 11 April 2011 it was announced that Byun had signed a one-year contract with the Jets.

Byun scored on his A-League debut for the Jets, sealing a 3–2 victory over Melbourne Heart in Newcastle. This was Byun's first goal in open play, after 146 games in professional competition. In the Round 14 game against Melbourne Victory Byun scored two own goals to give the Victory a 2–1 win at AAMI Park. On 8 December 2011 the future of Byun was uncertain after routine medical tests revealed a potentially serious heart condition. The test revealed that he had a left ventricular hypertrophy (enlarged left ventricle).

International career
Sung-Hwan has appeared for the South Korean U-23 team at the East Asian Games.

Career statistics

Honours
Sydney FC
 A-League Premiership: 2009–10
 A-League Championship: 2009–10

References

External links

 Sydney FC Official website

1979 births
Living people
Association football defenders
South Korean footballers
South Korean expatriate footballers
South Korea international footballers
Ulsan Hyundai FC players
Busan IPark players
Jeju United FC players
Seongnam FC players
K League 1 players
FC Anyang players
K League 2 players
Sydney FC players
Newcastle Jets FC players
A-League Men players
Sportspeople from Daegu
Expatriate soccer players in Australia
South Korean expatriate sportspeople in Australia
Asian Games medalists in football
Footballers at the 2002 Asian Games
Asian Games bronze medalists for South Korea
Medalists at the 2002 Asian Games